Sylvia Trent-Adams (born June 15, 1965) is a retired U.S. Public Health Service Commissioned Corps rear admiral, who last served as the principal deputy assistant secretary for health from January 2, 2019 to August 31, 2020. She previously served as the deputy surgeon general of the United States from October 25, 2015 to January 2, 2019. Trent-Adams also served as the acting surgeon general of the United States from April 21, 2017 to September 5, 2017. She retired from the U.S. Public Health Service on September 30, 2020 after over 33 years of combined uniformed service. On October 5, 2020, Trent-Adams was named to the board of directors for AMN Healthcare.

Education
Trent-Adams received a Bachelor of Science in nursing from Hampton University, a master of science in nursing and health policy from the University of Maryland, Baltimore, and a doctorate of nursing from the University of Maryland, Baltimore County. After attending college on an ROTC scholarship, she served as an officer in the U.S. Army Nurse Corps for five years, on the oncology unit of Walter Reed Army Medical Center.

Career
Trent-Adams has held various positions in HHS, working to improve access to care for poor and under-served communities. As a clinician and administrator, she has had a direct impact on building systems of care to improve public health for marginalized populations.

Prior to joining the Office of the Surgeon General, Trent-Adams was the deputy associate administrator for the HIV/AIDS Bureau (HAB), Health Resources and Services Administration (HRSA). She assisted in managing the $2.3 billion Ryan White HIV/AIDS Treatment Extension Act of 2009 (Ryan White HIV/AIDS Program) for uninsured people living with HIV disease as well as training for health care professionals.

Trent-Adams began her career in the Commissioned Corps of the PHSCC in 1992. She has published numerous articles and presented to organizations and professional groups. Prior to joining the USPHS, Trent-Adams was a nurse officer in the U.S. Army. She also served as a research nurse at the University of Maryland. Trent-Adams completed two internships in the U.S. Senate where she focused on the prospective payment system for skilled nursing facilities and scope of practice for nurses and psychologists. She has served as guest lecturer at the University of Maryland and Hampton University. Her clinical practice was in trauma, oncology, community health, and infectious disease. She serves as chair of the Federal Public Health Nurse Leadership Council, and the Federal Nursing Service Council.

Acting Surgeon General of the United States
On April 21, 2017, Trent-Adams was named acting surgeon general, replacing Vice Admiral Vivek Murthy, a physician, who was relieved as surgeon general by the Trump administration. In assuming the post, Trent-Adams became the second non-physician to serve as surgeon general. Robert A. Whitney, a veterinarian, served as the 17th (acting) surgeon general. She is the second nurse to serve in this role. Richard Carmona, who served in the role under George W. Bush, was both a nurse and a physician. She was succeeded by Vice Admiral Jerome Adams on September 5, 2017.

Awards and decorations

In 2017, she was awarded the Red Cross' Florence Nightingale Medal, the highest international distinction in the nursing profession.

Personal life
Trent-Adams grew up on a farm in Concord, Virginia and graduated from Appomattox County High School in 1983. She is married to Dennis Adams and has two daughters.

References

External links

 Sylvia Trent-Adams profile

1965 births
Living people
United States Public Health Service Commissioned Corps admirals
Hampton University alumni
University of Maryland, Baltimore alumni
Fellows of the American Academy of Nursing
Surgeons General of the United States
Obama administration personnel
Trump administration personnel
University of Maryland, Baltimore County alumni
African-American United States Army personnel
People from Appomattox County, Virginia
People from Campbell County, Virginia
Florence Nightingale Medal recipients
United States Public Health Service personnel
Members of the National Academy of Medicine